This is a list of films produced in Nicaragua.

A 
 Alsino and the Condor (Alsino y el cóndor) (1982)

C 
 El Center fielder (1985)
 El Chogui (2001)
 Cinema Alcázar (1997)
 Con ánimo de lucro (2006)

D 
 De niña a madre (2004)

E 
 Estos sí pasarán (1985)
Exiliada (2019)

G 
 The Ghost of War (El Espectro de la guerra, 1988)

H 
 Historia de Rosa (2005)

I 
 El Inmortal (2005)

L 
 Lady Marshall (1990)
 La Llamada de la muerte (1960)

M 
 Memorias del viento (1992)
 Metal y vidrio (2002)
 Mojados (2013)
 Mujeres en armas (1981)

N 
 No todos los sueños han sido soñados (1995)
 Nunca nos rendiremos (1984)

O 
 Okhota na drakona (1986)

S 
 Sandino (1990)
 Se le movió el piso: A portrait of Managua (1996)
 El Señor presidente (1983)

V 
 Voces de cenzontle (1999)

Y 
 La Yuma (2009)

See also 

 List of books and films about Nicaragua

References

External links 
 Nicaraguan film at the Internet Movie Database

Nicaragua
Films